Young Liberals may refer to:
Young Liberals (Australia)
Young Liberals Austria
Young Liberals of Canada
Young Liberals (Germany)
Young Liberals of Norway
Young Liberals (Switzerland)
Young Liberals (UK), the youth and student organisation of the UK Liberal Democrats
English Young Liberals
Scottish Young Liberals
Welsh Young Liberals
National League of Young Liberals, the 1903–1990 youth wing of the British Liberal Party
British Columbia Young Liberals, the youth wing of the British Columbia Liberal Party